Teigan O’Shannassy (born 14 April 1999) is an Australian netball player in the Suncorp Super Netball league, playing for Giants Netball.

O’Shannassy was elevated to the Giants senior team ahead of the 2019 season, after having been a training partner with the extended Giants squad the previous two years. The Giants elevated O’Shannassy into the line-up despite the fact she suffered a serious Achilles injury whilst representing the New South Wales Institute of Sport at the 2018 Netball New Zealand Super Club tournament. Prior to that setback she claimed a silver medal with the Canberra Giants in the Australian Netball League in 2018 and represented Australia at the World Youth Cup the previous year.

References

External links
 Giants Netball profile
 Netball New South Wales profile
 Suncorp Super Netball profile

1999 births
Australian netball players
Giants Netball players
Living people
Suncorp Super Netball players
Australian Netball League players
Netball New South Wales Waratahs players
Netball players from New South Wales
Canberra Giants (ANL) players
New South Wales Institute of Sport netball players
New South Wales state netball league players